Agostino Borromeo (born 24 January 1944 in Oreno, Milan, Italy) is an Italian professor and historian, and General Governor of the Order of the Holy Sepulchre.

Early life and background 
Agostino Borromeo comes from the aristocratic House of Borromeo family. He studied political science at Sapienza University of Rome. He also completed his musical studies in piano, organ and organ composition.

He is married to Beatrice Gonzalez de la Bastida Vergas, and they have three children. He likes playing tennis, skiing, and photography.

Career 
Agostino Borromeo is an author of over 180 publications on the religious history of Southern Europe, musicology and musical criticism.

He is an internationally acclaimed expert on the history of the Inquisition. In October 1998, following the opening of the archive of the Congregation for the Doctrine of the Faith he coordinated the organization of an international symposium on the history of Inquisition held in the Vatican. He was a Catholic commentator for the PBS television series Secret Files of the Inquisition.

He is also well known in the history of international relations in modern times and religious history of Spain.

He teaches Modern and Contemporary History of the Catholic Church and other Christian confessions at his alma mater, Sapienza University of Rome, and gives annual courses on the History of Christianity and of the Churches at the prestigious private university Libera Università Maria SS. Assunta, Rome.

Since 1992 president of the Italian Institute of Iberian Studies.

Since 2006 President of the "Don Giuseppe de Luca" Association, an institution for the research in the field of religious history.

Catholic Church 
Borromeo is an active Catholic for many years. As a young man, he participated in the Catholic scout movement. In 1993 he was elected a president an international Catholic association Circolo di Roma, founded in 1949, which gathers foreign diplomats accredited to the Holy See. In 2002 he was appointed a member of the Pontifical Committee for Historical Sciences. He is vice president of Italian National Union for the Transport of the Sick to Lourdes and International Shrines (Unitalsi).

Borromeo has been a member of the Order of the Holy Sepulchre since 1985. From 1995 to 2002 he served as a Member of the Grand Magisterium. From 2002 to 2004 he was the Orders' chancellor. In 2009 Cardinal John Patrick Foley, Grand Master of the Order, appointed him General Governor.

Selected works 
Borromeo is the editor and author of hundreds of publications. 
 Spain in Italy: Politics, Society, and Religion 1500–1700. Edited by Thomas James Dandelet, John A. Marino, American Academy in Rome, 2006. , 
 L' inquisizione : atti del simposio internazionale: Città del Vaticano, 29-31 ottobre 1998. By Agostino Borromeo. Città del Vaticano : Biblioteca Apostolica Vaticana, 2003.  9788821007613
 Storia religiosa della Spagna. Agostino Borromeo. Milano, Centro Ambrosiano, 1998.  9788880251798
 La Valtellina crocevia dell'Europa : politica e religione nell'età della Guerra dei trent'anni. By Agostino Borromeo; Quintín Aldea. Milano: Mondadori, 1998. OCLC Number: 954608350

Distinctions 
 Knight Grand Cross of the First Class of the Order of St. Gregory the Great (2017)
 Order of the Holy Sepulchre (1985)
 Knight Grand Cross of Justice of Sacred Military Constantinian Order of Saint George
 Order of Saint Januarius (2002)
 Member of the Italian Musicology Association (Società Italiana di Musicologia) (2000)
 Academic Correspondent of the Real Academia de la Historia (1988)
 Academic Correspondent of the Academia Portuguesa da História (Portuguese Academy of History, Lisbon) (1992)

References

External links 

1944 births
Living people
People from Vimercate
Agostino
Historians of the Catholic Church
Historians of Christianity
Historians of Spain
Historians of Italy
20th-century Italian male writers
21st-century Italian male writers
20th-century Italian historians
21st-century Italian historians
Sapienza University of Rome alumni
Academic staff of the Sapienza University of Rome
Knights of the Holy Sepulchre
Italian historians of religion